Terra Terra – The Aquarius Era is a music drama by Nicholas Lens. It is the second part of the operatic trilogy The Accacha Chronicles, following the successful first part Flamma Flamma. In 12 sections, the score combines orchestra, chorus and six operatic voices that contrast with the eerie tonalities of two female nasal-natural singers.

Cover, creations and adaptations

The cover of Terra Terra shows a vague image of Lens' daughter Clara-Lane Lens as foetus.
Terra Terra - The Aquarius Era premiered live on 30 October 1999 at the Musikhalle Hamburg in Germany.
The newly published score of Terra Terra (rewritten by Lens in 2005 as second part of The Accacha Chronicles), did not premiere yet.
A video film entitled Anima Superba (track 12 of Terra Terra) was directed by Isabelle Desprechins and produced by Tabaran Company.
The film was shot around the Ganges river in India showing original footage of death and birth rituals.

Credits 
Second part of the operatic trilogy by Nicholas Lens The Accacha Chronicles

Music, Libretto and Concept: Nicholas Lens
Published by Schott Music International Mainz/ New York City
Studio version released by Sony BMG International (1999 and 2005) (BMG Classics 74321 697182 and  Sony BMG 82876 66239 2)

Track listing 

 Mors O Suavissima Rerum
 Molitur Memoria
 Milliens Millenae
 Moritur Terra
 Terra Aquarius
 Eia! Eia! Fetus in Vulva
 Mater
 Pater
 Pupulus
 Infans Dolore
 Pupulam O Puram
 Anima Superba
 Deus Meus

External links
 Nicholas Lens' Official website
 Time magazine 
 Schott Music International 
 
 Biff, New York 
 Compact Discoveries 
 Sonymusic 
 Sony BMG 

Music dramas
Compositions by Nicholas Lens
Postmodern music
Contemporary classical compositions